Melissa Vargas (born 16 October 1999) is a Cuban-born Turkish  volleyball player who plays for Fenerbahçe Opet.

She was a member of the Cuba women's national volleyball team and was part of the Cuban national team at the 2014 FIVB Volleyball Women's World Championship in Italy.

Career
She won the Best Opposite award in the 2014 U23 Pan-American Cup. as well as Best Outside Hitter at the Pan American Cup and Games in 2015, Best Scorer at Final Four Cup 2015, Central American Caribbean Games 2014, NORCECA Pan American Cup Final Six 2015 and Champions League 2018/2019. Vargas also won Best Server at Chinese League 2021 and 2022, Turkey Kadinlar Voleybol Ligi 2018 and 2019 and Pan American Cup 2015

Clubs
  Cienfuegos (2011-2015)
  Agel Prostějov (2015-2016)
  Fenerbahçe (2018-2021)
  Tianjin Bohai Bank (2021)
  Fenerbahçe Opet (2021-present)

Awards

Individuals
 2014 U23 Pan-American Cup "Best Opposite"

References

1999 births
Living people
Cuban women's volleyball players
Turkish women's volleyball players
Turkish people of Cuban descent
Place of birth missing (living people)
Volleyball players at the 2015 Pan American Games
Pan American Games competitors for Cuba
Opposite hitters
Outside hitters
Cuban expatriate sportspeople in Turkey
Expatriate volleyball players in Turkey
Expatriate volleyball players in the Czech Republic